Beatriz Góis Dantas (born 1 December 1941) is a Brazilian anthropologist, folklorist, sociologist, writer, and professor emeritus of Anthropology at the Federal University of Sergipe.

Bibliography

Citations

References

 

Living people
1941 births
21st-century Brazilian women writers
Brazilian sociologists
Brazilian anthropologists
Brazilian folklorists
21st-century anthropologists
21st-century Brazilian writers
Women sociologists
Brazilian women anthropologists
Women folklorists
Academic staff of the Federal University of Sergipe
20th-century Brazilian women writers
20th-century Brazilian writers
20th-century anthropologists
Women historians